A helen is a humorous unit of measurement based on the concept that Helen of Troy, from the Iliad, had a "face that launched a thousand ships". The helen is thus used to measure quantities of beauty in terms of the theoretical action that could be accomplished by the wielder of such beauty.

Origin

The classic reference to Helen's beauty is Marlowe's lines from the 1592 play The Tragical History of Doctor Faustus, "Was this the face that launch'd a thousand ships / And burnt the topless towers of Ilium?" In the tradition of humorous pseudounits, then, 1 millihelen is the amount of beauty needed to launch a single ship.

According to The Rebel Angels, a 1981 novel by Robertson Davies, this system was invented by Cambridge mathematician W.A.H. Rushton. In his 1992 collection of jokes and limericks, Isaac Asimov claimed to have invented the term in the 1940s as a graduate student. In a 1958 letter to the New Scientist, R.C. Winton proposes the millihelen as the amount of beauty required to launch one ship. In response, P. Lockwood noted that the unit had been independently proposed by Edgar J. Westbury and extended by the pair to negative values, where −1 millihelen was the amount of ugliness required to sink a battleship.

Frank Muir or Denis Norden quoted it on the BBC Home Service/Radio Four quiz panel game 'My Word!', broadcast between 1956 and 1988.

The earliest known print citation is found in Punch magazine dated June 23 1954 and  attributed to an unnamed “professor of natural philosophy”.

Derived units
The Catalogue of Ships from Book II of The Iliad, which describes in detail the commanders who came to fight for Helen and the ships they brought with them, details a total of 1,186 ships which came to fight the Trojan War.  As such, Helen herself has a beauty rating of 1.186 helen, capable of launching more than one thousand ships.

The "system" has been expanded by some writers, such as conceiving of negative values as measures of the ugliness required to beach a thousand ships. Writing a humorous article about the concept, David Goines considered a range of metric prefixes to the unit, ranging from the attohelen (ah) which could merely "light up a Lucky while strolling past a shipyard", to the terahelen (Th) able to "launch the equivalent of one quadrillion Greek warships and make serious inroads on the welfare of the galaxy".

Theoretical physicist Thomas Fink defines beauty in The Man's Book both in terms of ships launched and in terms of the number of women, on average, than whom one woman will be more beautiful. He defines one helen (H) as the quantity of beauty to be more beautiful than 50 million women, the number of women estimated to have been alive in the 12th century BCE.
Fink also defines a related, but smaller unit called a “helena” (Ha), based on a logarithmic scale, like the Richter scale, or decibels (dB). Ten helena (Ha) is the beauty sufficient for one oarsman (of which 50 are on a ship) to risk his life, or to be the most beautiful of a thousand women. Since the unit is logarithmic on a base of 2, for beauty to increase by 1 Ha, a woman must be the most beautiful of twice as many women, so one helen is equivalent to 25.6 Ha. The most beautiful woman who ever lived would score 34.2 Ha, the equivalent of 1.34 helen, the pick of a dozen women would be 3.6 Ha, or 0.14 helen.

See also
List of humorous units of measurement

References

Units of measurement
Humour
Cultural depictions of Helen of Troy
Beauty